Drottningstorp is a village in Habo Municipality, Sweden, located near the western shorelines of Domneådammen between  Habo and Mullsjö. Since 2006, an annual country music festival, "Drottningstorps midsommardagscountry",  has been held here on Midsummer Day.

References

External links

Populated places in Habo Municipality